Nurkot (also spelled Noorkot or Noor Kot) is a town located on the Right (western) bank of the Nullah Baein torrent, 30 km by road northeast of Narowal city, in Shakargarh Tehsil of Narowal District of the Punjab province of Pakistan, at an elevation of 258 meters. Nurkot and the adjoining town of Maingri have grown into each other and are often referred to collectively. Together, they form the largest and the most important town of the Constituency PP-48 of Punjab Assembly. It is the economic, educational, social and transport hub for the surrounding small towns and villages in the region. Because of its proximity to the Indian border and permanent presence of military forces in the cantonment area, Nurkot is a strategically important town.

History

The sixteenth century document Ain-i-Akbari mentions Maingri Pargana of the Rachna Sarkar in the Lahore Subah of Mughal Empire, inhabited by Gujjars and Silhariya, as comprising 62,293 Bigha of agricultural land generating a revenue of 1.475 million Dams, and the local forces consisting of 20 cavalry and 1,000 infantry. The area was later annexed by the Jammu Rajas in early eighteenth century, in 1778 Kanhaiya Sardars took it and in the early nineteenth century it was annexed by Ranjit Singh. The area was then annexed by the British after the Second Anglo-Sikh War in 1849. Later on, Maingri became a Zail of Shakargarh Tehsil.

In 1853, Shakargarh Tehsil of Sialkot District was transferred to Gurdaspur District and it remained an administrative subdivision of Gurdaspur District until Partition in 1947. Under Radcliffe Award, three of the four tehsils of Gurdaspur district on the eastern bank of the Ujh river (which joined the Ravi a little further down) – the tahsils of Gurdaspur, Batala and Pathankot – were awarded to India and only one, Shakargarh, was assigned to Pakistan. After the creation of Pakistan, Shakargarh became a part of Sialkot District once again. In July 1991, two tehsils (Narowal and Shakargarh) were split off from Sialkot District and Shakargarh became a tehsil of the newly formed Narowal District.

Shakargarh was the gateway of Mughals entering Gurdaspur and going to Delhi . Shakargarh was also the gateway to Kashmir and regarded as the rest point for travellers. One of the main reason for its popularity was and still is its rich and fertile land for wheat and top quality rice cultivation. One of the superior land for rice cultivation in world.  Nurkot was named after a prominent local leader 'Noor Ipu' from Monnan Clan of Gujjars who laid foundation of this town in earlier 18th or late 17th century.

Language

As per the 1998 census of Pakistan, Punjabi language is spoken by 100% population of the town. Other Languages include:
Urdu being national language is spoken and understood.
English is also understood and spoken by the sizable educated people.

Hospitals and medical centres

Dr Naseer clinic Nathokot, Katarian
Basic Health unit Meer pur Gujjran
Govt. Hospital Fateh Pur road Maingri
Dr. Khalid Clinic
Dr. Shehzad Clinic
Dr. Riaz Clinic
Dr. Shaffique Clinic

Banks
National Bank Of Pakistan Nurkot Maingri Branch Shakargarh Road Nurkot
HBL Nurkot Branch
 ABL Nurkot Branch Opposite Govt Elementary School Maingri
 MCB Nurkot Branch Shakargarh Road Nurkot

Educational Institutions

Govt High school Maingri
PMG School (Muhammad Nadeem Rasikh Chauhan Advocate High Cou
Cambridge Cadet School & College
Concept college.
Ittehad Ijaz public high Maingri Noorkot
Govt girls college maingri
Royal school and college
Rawal college of commerce
Ghazali college of arts
Grammar school and college
 New Talent Science Academy Maingri (Ahsin Riaz & Muhammad Shakeel)
 Career Public School Maingri Nurkot (PEF) Muhammad Faryad

Main markets

Jafar Market Lari Adda Nurkot
Al-Khair Market Lari Adda Nurkot
Main Bazar Nurkot
Cantt. Bazar Nurkot
Moti Bazar Nurkot
Qazi Market Nurkot

Important places
Ch Sharif late Chachi House Hussain Pur Babrian
Nurkot Cantonment
Nurkot Police Station
Nurkot Post Office
Nurkot railway station
Jamia Masjid Naqsh-e-Lasani
Jamia Masjid Bahar-e-Madinah
Jamia Masjid Farooqiyah
Imam Bargah Husseini
Jamia Masjid Maingri
Nala baen
Maingri High School
Rizawan Asif (Former International Footballer) House
Govt Hospital Maingri

Nearby areas
51771 Hussein pur Babrian
51771 Mirpur Gujran
51771 Chak Qazian
51771 Bua(Naimat pur) 
51801 Khanowal
51771 Pindi Minhasan
51771 Rai Pur
51771 Mailo Sailo
51771 Chak Bahauddin
51770 Kotly Jattan 1 km distance from Nurkot
 51770 BAGGA MANSOORA 1 KM FROM NURKOT

References

Cities in Punjab (Pakistan)